Eklavya Model Residential School (EMRS) is a Government of India scheme for model residential school, specifically for Scheduled Tribes across India. It is one of the flagship interventions of the Ministry of Tribal Affairs, Government of India and was introduced in the year 1997-98 to ensure tribal students get access to quality education in the remote tribal areas. EMRSs are set up in States/UTs with grants under Article 275(1) of the Constitution of India. As per the budget 2018-19, every block with more than 50% ST population and at least 20,000 tribal persons, will have an Eklavya Model Residential School by the year 2022.

The government gives one time ₹30 lakh grant for establishing the school, thereafter up to ₹30 lakh per school annually. Additional cost is borne by state governments. At the end of 2018, a total of 284 EMRSs have been sanctioned with maximum of 32 approved in Madhya Pradesh. There is around 226 EMRSs functional across the country and 68 of them are affiliated to the CBSE.

Introduction

In the context of the trend of establishing quality residential schools for the promotion of education in all areas and habitations in the country, the Eklavya Model Residential Schools (EMRS) for ST students take their place among the Jawahar Navodaya Vidyalayas (JNVs), the Kasturba Gandhi Balika Vidyalayas (KGBVs) and the Kendriya Vidyalayas (KVs).

Objectives

a)        Comprehensive physical, mental and socially relevant development of all students enrolled in each and every EMRS. Students will be empowered to be change agents, beginning in their school, in their homes, in their village and finally in a larger context.

b)        Focus differentially on the educational support to be made available to those in Standards XI and XII, and those in standards VI to X, so that their distinctive needs can be met,

c)        Support the annual running expenses in a manner that offers reasonable remuneration to the staff and upkeep of the facilities.

d)        Support the construction of infrastructure that provides education, physical, environmental and cultural needs of student life.

Structure of EMRS

a)      Admission to these schools will be through selection/competition with suitable provision for preference to children belonging to Primitive Tribal Groups, first generation students, etc.

b)      Sufficient land would be given by the State Government for the school, play grounds, hostels, residential quarters, etc., free of cost.

c)      The number of seats for boys and girls will be equal.

d)      In these schools, education will be entirely free.

e)      Every class can have maximum 60 students preferably in 2 sections of 30 students each and the total sanctioned strength of the school will be 480 students.

f)       At the Higher Secondary level (class XI & XII), there will be three sections per class for the three streams in Science, Commerce & Humanities. The maximum sanctioned strength of the each section may be 30 students. In case of short fall in a section, ST students from other schools may be admitted as per procedure mentioned at above para (a).

Recruitment of Staff

CHAPTER 2: EMRS TEACHING STAFF SELECTION EXAM (ETSSE)– 2021
2.1. About EMRS-Teaching Staff Selection Exam- 2021
The NESTS has taken several initiatives in the recent past to improve the quality of education in the 
EMRSs. Keeping in view the needs of the local tribals, the NESTS is conducting a special drive at the 
central level in association with the State Governments to fill up the vacancies of teaching staff to 
provide quality human resources, technically equipped and motivated in order to maintain the 
quality standards of EMRSs.
The following points are to be considered for recruitment: -
a. The recruitment of the teaching staff (Principal, Vice Principal, PGT and TGT) for EMRSs shall be 
state specific i.e. as per the State, where the schools are located, in accordance with the 
recruitment rules notified by NESTS, MoTA; and only eligible candidates having domicile 
certificate of the State can apply. 
b. National Testing Agency (NTA) is to conduct National Level EMRS-Teaching Staff Selection Exam.
c. Following the reservation roster of the respective State/UTs, NTA will provide State-wise, post-
wise, category-wise merit list to NESTS, MoTA.
d. States/UTs will conduct personality test/ interviews and finalize the selection list of candidates. 
e. State/UT level interview panel will be constituted by the States/UTs that shall consist of various 
domain experts from the States and members from the NESTS/MoTA.
f. Appointment of teaching staff will be completed by the States/UTs following State-specific 
reservation roster. 
g. The State/UT EMRS Society shall be responsible for final selection, implementation of 
reservation roster and posting of teachers in the State/UT. 
h. The selection of Principal, Vice Principal and PGT shall be by merit in which Computer-Based 
Test (CBT) carries 160 marks and the personality test/ interview carries 40 marks. However, for 
TGTs there won’t be a personality test/ interview and the merit shall be determined solely by 
the computer-based test of 180 marks. 
2.2. Post Details and Level of Pay
S. 
No. Post Details Subjects Pay Matrix
1.
Principal - Level 12
(Rs. 78800 –209200/-)
2. Vice Principal—Level 10 
(Rs. 56100- 177500/-)
3.
Post Graduate 
Teachers (PGTs)
English / Hindi / Physics / Chemistry / 
Mathematics / Economics / Biology / History 
/ Geography / Commerce / Information 
Technology
Level 8 
(Rs.47600- 151100/-)
4. Trained Graduate 
Teachers (TGTs)
English / Hindi / Mathematics / Science 
/Social Studies
Level 7 
(Rs.44900 – 142400/-)
2.3. Scheme of Examination
2.3.1. Mode of Examination
EMRS Teaching Staff Selection Exam (ETSSE) will be conducted in “Computer Based Test (CBT)” mode only and interview is conducted by state.

Location of EMRS

Thirteen EMRS schools have been started functioning since 2000 in three phases in the tribal pockets of Odisha. The locations are afore mentioned:
1. Bhawanipur, Sundargarh
2. Dhanghera, Mayurbhanj
3. Pungar, Koraput
4. Kandhamal
5. Hirli, Nabarangpur 
6. Siriguda, Rayagada
7. Gajapati 
8. Ranki, Keonjhar
9. Laing, Sundargarh
10. Lahunipada, Sundargarh
11. Rampilo, Jajpur 
12. Nuapada
13. Malkangiri

Seven ‘Eklavya Model Residential Schools’ are functioning in West Bengal, the Districts are:
(1) Bankura
(2) Purulia
(3) Burdwan
(4) Paschim Medinipur
(5) Jalpaiguri
(6) Birbhum
(7) Dakshin Dinajpur

With funds from Government of India and the State Government. Two new EMRS at Bolpur Santiniketan (Birbhum) and Buniadpur (Dakshin Dinajpur) have started functioning in this academic year 2013-14. Each school has a capacity of 420 students. At present total number of students are 2072. The students who are admitted in these schools are provided with scholarships, free food and lodging etc.

Annexure

The following items may particularly be included in the lay-out of the Eklavya Model Residential School.

School

·         Sufficient no. of class rooms.

·         Teachers resource room/computer lab.

·         Students computer lab/language room

·         Library

·         Science laboratory

·         General purpose hall/ Recreation Room/ Auditorium (can be combined with dining space)

·         Infirmary/ sick room

Residences

·        Housing for teachers, security and supporting staff

Hostel

·         Well ventilated dormitories

·         Assured/ reliable water supply

·         Office Room for hostel warden

·         Courtyard/verandah for washing and drying clothes

·         Recreation/common room/covered courtyard for rainy season activities

·         Rainwater harvesting

·         Reliable sewage system

·         Openable/cleanable nets on doors and windows to keep out mosquitoes/insects.

·         Dining/Kitchen

Ø  Solar water heating

Ø  Kitchen garden and compost pit

Ø  Kitchen utensil washing area

Ø  Multipurpose area-covered verandah attached to kitchen

·         Housing for wardens, security and supporting staff (in case of proposals relating to Ashram Schools)

·         Outdoor areas

Ø  Compound wall

Ø  Area for plantation of nutritional fruit trees

Ø  Garden and small shed

Ø  Toilets for workers/visitors

·         Utilities

Ø  Electrical control room

Ø  Underground tanks, pump house

Ø  Sewage treatment plant

Ø  Security cabin/guard room

·         The entire school building including library, laboratories and toilets should be accessible to children with disabilities.

Government of Maharashtra Model United Nations
Tribal Department, Maharashtra has nominated tribal students from all Eklavya Model Residential Schools across Maharashtra to participate in the Government of Maharashtra Model United Nations (MUN) to be held in University of Mumbai, Kalina Campus. The Government of Maharashtra-CASI MUN is an annual event where all schools and Colleges across Maharashtra participate annually.

Building And Design Layout

(i)           The land allocation for each school should be 20 acres of which up to 3.5 acres may be used for the construction purposes. The remaining area must be maintained properly and a reasonable portion may be earmarked for sports/ games.

(ii)        The plan of the school must indicate a layout of the compound, including the kitchen, vegetable garden and plantation (fruits and nutritional trees like drumsticks (moringa/Sahjan), citrus) areas. States/UTs are encouraged to use fuel saving or renewable energy technologies in the school by availing of the schemes of the Ministry of New & Renewable Energy.

(iii)       The design of the EMRS must take certain essential components into account as well as local, environmental characteristics. A list of suggested essential components is at Annexure.

iv)       The norms and standards of a school in respect of ‘Building’ as laid down in the Schedule to the Right of Children to Free and Compulsory Education Act 2009, shall be strictly ensured.

Cost and Budget

 Capital Cost (non-recurring) 
The capital cost for the school complex, including hostels and staff quarters will now be Rs. 12.00 crore with a provision to go up to Rs.16.00 crore in hill areas, deserts and islands. Any escalation will have to be met by State Government/UT.

 Recurring Cost
Recurring cost during the first year for schools would be @ Rs. 42000/- per child. This may be raised by 10% every second year to compensate for inflation etc.

For procurement of essential, non-recurring items like furniture/equipment including for the kitchen, dining, hostel, recreation, garden etc. @ Rs.10 lakh per school - will be allowed once in every 5 years, allowing for inflation.
The annual budget for recurring expenditure shall be formulated and placed before the Management Committee for approval at the end of the each financial year for the next year. The rates for calculation of recurring costs may be based on the prevailing rates sanctioned for the Jawahar Navodaya Vidyalaya from time to time.
The amount under recurring cost, due to each functioning EMRS, would be released by the State/UT Government to the bank account of the EMRS. The bank account of each EMRS for this purpose may be opened jointly in the name of the Principal of the EMRS and any Member of the Management Committee who is also a Government official.

See also
 Indian tribal belt

References

External links
 
 
 

Boarding schools in India
Government schemes in India
Boarding schools in Gujarat
Schools in Odisha
Scheduled Tribes of India
Schools in Madhya Pradesh
Schools in Chhattisgarh
Ministry of Tribal Affairs
Boarding schools in West Bengal
1997 establishments in India